Furth or Fürth may refer to:

Fürth (surname)
Fürth, northern Bavaria, Germany
Fürth (district), Bavaria, Germany
Fürth (electoral district). Bavaria, Germany
Furth, Lower Bavaria, Bavaria, Germany
Fürth, Hesse, Germany
Furth, part of Gloggnitz, Lower Austria
Furth, part of Maria Anzbach, Lower Austria
Furth (mountain), a British classification of hills
Furth im Wald, Bavaria, near the Czech Republic
SpVgg Greuther Fürth, a  German football club based in Fürth, Bavaria

See also